Riedelia is a genus of flies in the family Tachinidae.

Species
Riedelia bicolor Mesnil, 1942

References

Dexiinae
Insects of China
Diptera of Asia
Tachinidae genera
Monotypic Brachycera genera